Glendower is an unincorporated community in Albemarle County, Virginia.

Pine Knot was listed on the National Register of Historic Places in 1989.

References

Unincorporated communities in Virginia
Unincorporated communities in Albemarle County, Virginia